Bentheledone is a genus of octopuses in the family Megaleledonidae.

Species
 Bentheledone albida *  (Berry, 1917) 
 Bentheledone rotunda (Hoyle, 1885)

The species listed above with an asterisk (*) are questionable and need further study to determine if they are valid species or synonyms.

Habitat
B. rotunda lives throughout the Antarctic Ocean. Little is known about B. albida; further research has to be done.

References

 

Octopodidae
Cephalopod genera